CRL-40,941 (also known as fladrafinil  and fluorafinil) is a eugeroic closely related to adrafinil and modafinil. It is the bis(p-fluoro) ring-substituted derivative of adrafinil. CRL-40,941 was found to produce antiaggressive effects in animals, which adrafinil does not produce, and is purportedly 3 - 4 times stronger than adrafinil.

See also
 Adrafinil
 Armodafinil
 CRL-40,940
 Fluorenol
 CE-123

References

Abandoned drugs
Benzene derivatives
Designer drugs
Drugs with unknown mechanisms of action
Fluoroarenes
Hydroxamic acids
Prodrugs
Stimulants
Sulfoxides